Formerly known as New York TV Show Tickets, Inc. (NYTIX) and is now known as New York Show Tickets Inc.. This organization is a New York City-based marketing company that provides a variety of entertainment services. Services include Broadway show marketing, TV shows taping marketing, parking, restaurants, and New York city tours. The company has listings for Broadway shows and television shows, a NYC restaurant guide, articles on TV programs, Broadway theater profiles, and advice on ways that visitors can see New York attractions cheaply.

Background

The organization began in November 1995 as New York TV Show Tickets and specialized in recruiting and managing audiences for tapings of TV shows that were recorded in the New York City area. Early TV shows for which they managed the audience included The Gordon Elliott Show, Rolonda, Dr. Laura, and NBC's Later Today (all of which have long since disappeared from TV). They were in the middle of a project with the Sally Jesse Raphael Show to automate ticketing, when the show was canceled.
New York TV Show Tickets also worked with The Rosie O'Donnell Show and Emeril Lagasse's Emeril Live, both of which are no longer on air.
A big problem with many New York-based TV shows has been effective audience management, since the role of the audience coordinator is most often an entry-level position and therefore has high turnover.  New York TV Show Tickets attempted to bring some consistency to the TV productions it worked with by helping them maintain some continuity when staff changed.

Verizon's 540 Local Toll Call Phone Lines

In 1986, NYNEX created Public Access Line Ports to serve New York's five boroughs. These PALP's allowed businesses to provide a "virtual" central phone service that wasn't encumbered by equipment or line rental. This system had high limits to the number of calls it could receive at any one time and was perfect for delivering audio information services and billing back the relevant call charges to the subscriber. Nynex created a variety of PALPs, and one iteration was called a 540 line. nytix took advantage of this service and launched their first 540 line in January 1995 on the line number 212 540 8499. The advent of the internet reduced the profitability and value of 540 lines to Verizon, and in 1998 they discontinued the service. nytix was still receiving calls on their 540 line on the day they stopped the service.

Content

nytix's 540 line (which is no longer active) provided up-to-date television audience information to people that called in. It provided a centralized method of connecting a TV production to its audience members, so that people would get the day's ticket availability and then be provided with directions to the show of their choice. The nytix 540 line became very popular and was often receiving over 1000 calls a day from people looking to acquire TV show tickets.
With the burgeoning popularity of the internet, nytix switched its services to web-only.  In 1998, New York TV Show Tickets also began offering Broadway-related content, which eventually became its main focus.  As a result, the company's full name is now rather misleading.

Revenue Sources

Today, nytix sells online information guides (accessible through their website) that explain how to get discounted tickets to Broadway shows and free tickets to New York-area TV tapings. nytix makes its money by charging $4 for a 30-day "subscription" to its Broadway Ticket Guide, which lists Broadway discount codes.  However, many similar discount codes can be obtained for free by simply registering with sites like Playbill and TheaterMania.  nytix's argument for charging a fee is that it has a broader range of codes for more shows and that it doesn't inundate customers with e-mails like the other services, but this is arguable as they do typically email their email base 1- 2 times per week.  A February 15, 2007 Wall Street Journal article  that compared online last-minute ticket buying options found that nytix's discounts were similar to BroadwayBox's, and that both services were cheaper than Gotickets and Entertainment Link, concluding that nytix's "service is worth it for regular theatergoers who are open about what to see and when."

Better Business Bureau Membership

New York Show Tickets, Inc. is currently a member of the New York Metro BBB Better Business Bureau. They are also a member of  NYC and Company (Formerly known as New York Convention and Visitors Bureau NYCVB)

References

External links
 nytix.com Official Website
 Wall Street Journal Article - Scoring Broadway Tickets

Broadway theatre
Culture of New York City
Theatre in New York City
1995 establishments in New York City